The 2012 America East Conference baseball tournament took place from May 23 through 25.  The top four regular season finishers of the league's six teams met in the double-elimination tournament held at Stony Brook University's Joe Nathan Field.  Stony Brook won their fourth America East Championship, defeating Maine 13–6 in the championship game, and earned the conference's automatic bid to the 2012 NCAA Division I baseball tournament.

Seeding
The top four finishers from the regular season will be seeded one through four based on conference winning percentage only.  They then played a double-elimination format.  The top seed played the fourth seed while the second and third seeds faced off in the first round.

Results

All-Tournament Team
The following players were named to the All-Tournament Team.

Most Outstanding Player
James Campbell was named Most Outstanding Player.  Campbell was a pitcher for Stony Brook.

References

Tournament
America East Conference Baseball Tournament
American East Conference baseball tournament
America East Conference baseball tournament
College baseball tournaments in New York (state)